Port Colden is an unincorporated community and census-designated place (CDP) located within Washington Township, in Warren County, New Jersey, United States, that was created as part of the 2010 United States Census. As of the 2010 Census, the CDP's population was 122.

The community was named for its location on the Morris Canal and after Cadwallader D. Colden, president of the Morris Canal Company.

Geography
According to the United States Census Bureau, the CDP had a total area of 0.197 square miles (0.509 km2), all of which was land.

Demographics

Census 2010

Historic district
The Port Colden Historic District was added to the National Register of Historic Places on January 21, 1999.

Wineries
 Vacchiano Farm

References

Census-designated places in Warren County, New Jersey
Washington Township, Warren County, New Jersey